Yeast extract agar is a growth medium containing yeast extract. It may refer to:

 The nonselective yeast extract agar of Windle Taylor
 YM (selective medium), for yeasts and molds
 Buffered charcoal yeast extract agar, for Legionella